John Thomas O'Farrell (died 2 January 1971) was an Irish Labour Party politician and trade union official. He was a member of the Railway Clerks' Association and served as the president of the Irish Trades Union Congress in 1927.

He was an unsuccessful Labour Party candidate for the Dublin North-West constituency at the 1922 general election. He was elected to the new Irish Free State Seanad in 1922 for 3 years. He was re-elected for a 12-year term at the 1925 Seanad election and served until the Free State Seanad was abolished in 1936. He also stood unsuccessfully for the Dublin County constituency at the 1943 general election. He was elected to the 6th Seanad Éireann in 1948 by the Labour Panel. He resigned from the Seanad on 31 May 1950.

References

 

Year of birth missing
1971 deaths
Labour Party (Ireland) senators
Members of the 1922 Seanad
Members of the 1925 Seanad
Members of the 1928 Seanad
Members of the 1931 Seanad
Members of the 1934 Seanad
Members of the 6th Seanad
Trade unionists from Dublin (city)
Politicians from Dublin (city)